Aperregi is a hamlet and concejo located in the municipality of Zuia, in Álava province, Basque Country, Spain. It lies between Lukiano and Domaikia.

References

External links
 

Concejos in Zuia